Tobinsport is a small unincorporated community located along the Ohio River in Tobin Township, Perry County, in the U.S. state of Indiana. Directly across the river is Cloverport, Kentucky. It is at the southernmost point of Perry County.

History
A post office was established at Tobinsport in 1865, and remained in operation until it was discontinued in 1891. Robert Tobin served as postmaster.

See also
List of cities and towns along the Ohio River

References

Unincorporated communities in Perry County, Indiana
Unincorporated communities in Indiana
Indiana populated places on the Ohio River